Gryllita arizonae, the Arizona cricket, is a species of cricket in the subfamily Gryllinae.. It is found in North America.

References

Further reading

 
 
 

Gryllinae
Articles created by Qbugbot
Insects described in 1935